Cyrille Tahay (30 October 1938 – 23 October 2021) was a Belgian politician. He was a member of the Humanist Democratic Centre (cdH), formerly known as the Christian Social Party (PSC).

References

1938 births
2021 deaths
Belgian politicians
Members of the Parliament of Wallonia
Centre démocrate humaniste politicians
People from Luxembourg (Belgium)